This is a list of Japanese football transfers in the winter transfer window 2016–17 by club.

J1 League

J2 League

J3 League

References 

2016–17
Transfers
Japan